The Portadown Textile Workers' Union was a trade union in the United Kingdom.

The union split from the Portadown, Banbridge and District Textile Workers' Union, which had been established in 1909.  Always a very small union, it merged with the Transport and General Workers' Union in 1933.

References

Arthur Ivor Marsh. Concise encyclopedia of industrial relations. Gower Press, Dec 1, 1979 pg. 316

See also
 List of trade unions
 Transport and General Workers' Union
 TGWU amalgamations

Defunct trade unions of Ireland
Textile and clothing trade unions
Trade unions disestablished in 1933
Trade unions in Northern Ireland
Transport and General Workers' Union amalgamations